This section of the list of former state routes in New York contains all routes numbered between 301 and 400.

References

 301